Seow Chuan Koh is a Singaporean philatelist who was added to the Roll of Distinguished Philatelists in 1992.

Koh has formed gold medal winning collections of classic India, Jaipur State, Perak, and Japanese handstamps on the stamps of the Straits Settlements.

References

Signatories to the Roll of Distinguished Philatelists
Living people
Year of birth missing (living people)
Fellows of the Royal Philatelic Society London
Singaporean philatelists